SpaceX Starship development began in 2012, when Elon Musk, CEO of American aerospace company SpaceX, first publicly described a high-level plan to build a reusable rocket system with substantially greater capabilities than the Falcon 9 and the (then- planned) Falcon Heavy. The rocket evolved through many design and name changes. On July 25, 2019, the Starhopper prototype performed the first successful flight at SpaceX Starbase near Boca Chica, Texas. The SN15 prototype rocket was the first full size test spacecraft to take off and land successfully, in May 2021.

History 
As early as 2007, Musk stated a personal goal of eventually enabling human exploration and settlement of Mars. SpaceX began development of the Raptor rocket engine (the engine used in Starship) before 2014. From 2011 to 2014, Musk made various statements expressing his hope that SpaceX would send humans to Mars in the 2020s to 2030s.

Mars Colonial Transporter 
In October 2012, Musk first publicly articulated a plan to build a fully reusable rocket system with substantially greater capabilities than the Falcon 9. The launch vehicle was described as part of the company's Mars system architecture, then known as Mars Colonial Transporter (MCT). The idea included reusable rocket engines, launch vehicles and space capsules to transport humans to Mars and return them to Earth. SpaceX COO Gwynne Shotwell mentioned that the payload could reach 150–200 tons to low Earth orbit. The MCT vehicle was to be "an evolution of SpaceX's Falcon 9 booster ... much bigger [than Falcon 9]."

In June 2013, Musk stated that he intended to defer SpaceX's IPO until after the "Mars Colonial Transporter is flying regularly."

According to SpaceX engine development head Tom Mueller, SpaceX could use nine Raptor engines on a single rocket, just as the Falcon 9 booster used nine Merlin engines. The rocket would be at least  in diameter — nearly three times the diameter and over seven times the cross-sectional area of the Falcon 9 booster cores. It was expected to have up to three cores totaling at least 27 engines.

Interplanetary Transport System 

In 2016, Musk abandoned the Mars Colonial Transporter name, as the system would be able to "go well beyond Mars", in favor of Interplanetary Transport System (ITS). That year he unveiled details of the space mission architecture, launch vehicle, spacecraft, and Raptor engines. The first firing of a Raptor engine occurred on a test stand in September 2016.

In October 2016, Musk indicated that the initial prepreg carbon-fiber tank test article, built with no sealing liner, had performed well in cryogenic fluid testing. A pressure test at approximately 2/3 of the design burst pressure was completed in November 2016.

In July 2017, Musk indicated that the architecture had evolved since 2016 in order to support commercial transport via Earth-orbit and cislunar launches.

Design 
The ITS stack was composed of two stages. The first stage was to be a launch booster, while the second stages would be either an "Interplanetary Spaceship" for crewed transport or an "ITS tanker" for orbital refueling. Both stages were to be powered by Raptors.

The Raptor was a bipropellant liquid rocket engine in a full flow staged combustion cycle, with liquid methane fuel and liquid oxygen oxidizer. Both propellants would enter the combustion chamber in the gas phase. A bleed-off of the high-pressure gas would provide autogenous pressurization of the propellant tanks, eliminating the Falcon 9's problematic high-pressure helium pressurization system.

Both stages were to have been constructed of lightweight carbon fiber, including the deep-cryogenic propellant tanks, a major change from the Falcon 9's aluminum-lithium alloy tank and structure material. Both stages were to be fully reusable and land vertically.

ITS booster

The engine configuration included 21 engines in an outer ring and 14 in an inner ring. The center cluster of seven engines was to be gimbaled for directional control, although some directional control  was to be performed via differential thrust on the fixed engines. Thrust on each engine was aimed to vary between 20 and 100 percent of rated thrust.

The propellants would also power the reaction control thrusters, while in the gas phase. These thrusters would control booster orientation in space, as well as improve accuracy during landing.

The design goal was to achieve a separation velocity of approximately  while retaining about 7% of the initial propellant to achieve a vertical landing at the launch pad.

The design called for grid fins to guide the booster during atmospheric reentry. The booster return flights were expected to encounter loads lower than the Falcon 9, principally because the ITS would have both a lower mass ratio and a lower density. The booster was to be designed for 20 g nominal loads, and possibly as high as 30–40 g.

In contrast to the landing approach used on SpaceX's mid-2010s reusable rocket first stages—either a large, flat concrete pad or downrange floating landing platform, the ITS booster was to designed to land on the launch mount itself, for immediate refueling and relaunch.

Second stage 
The ITS did not have a dedicated single-function second stage for achieving orbit. Instead, the second stage function of reaching orbit was a secondary role for a spacecraft capable of long-duration spaceflight.

The Interplanetary Spaceship was a large passenger-carrying spacecraft design proposed in September 2016. The ship would operate as a second-stage, and as an interplanetary transport vehicle for cargo and passengers. The three sea-level Raptor engines would be used for maneuvering, descent, and landing, as well as an initial ascent from the Mars surface.

The ITS tanker was a second stage propellant tanker variant. After refueling operations, it was to land and be prepared for another flight.

Reusability 
Both stages were to be designed to be fully reusable and were to land vertically, using Falcon 9-generation technologies.

Importantly, the "fully and rapidly reusable" aspect of the ITS design was the largest factor in the SpaceX analysis for reducing the cost of transporting mass to space. While the 2016-17 system under development relied on several cost-reducing elements, reusability alone was claimed to reduce that cost by approximately  orders of magnitude over NASA's previous missions. Musk stated that this was over half of the  orders of magnitude that he claimed was needed to enable a sustainable beyond-Earth settlement.

Big Falcon Rocket 

In September 2017, at the 68th annual meeting of the International Astronautical Congress, Musk announced a new launch vehicle called the Big Falcon Rocket (BFR). He said, "we are searching for the right name, but the code name, at least, is BFR." Its goal was to send two cargo missions to Mars in 2022, with the goal to "confirm water resources and identify hazards" while deploying "power, mining, and life support infrastructure" for future flights. This would be followed by four ships in 2024, two crewed BFR spaceships plus two cargo-only ships carrying equipment and supplies for a propellant plant.

The design balanced objectives such as payload mass, landing capabilities, and reliability. The initial design showed the ship with six Raptor engines (two sea-level, four vacuum) down from nine in the previous ITS design. The engine layout, reentry aerodynamic surface designs, and even the basic material of construction each changed thereafter.

By September 2017, Raptors had been test-fired for a combined total of 20 minutes across 42 test cycles. The longest test was 100 seconds, limited by the size of the propellant tanks. In November 2017, Shotwell indicated that approximately half of all development work on BFR was focused on the  engine.

SpaceX looked for manufacturing sites in California, Texas, Louisiana, and Florida. By September 2017, SpaceX had started building launch vehicle components: "The tooling for the main tanks has been ordered, the facility is being built, we will start construction of the first ship [in the second quarter of 2018.]"

By early 2018, the first carbon composite prototype ship was under construction, and SpaceX had begun building a new production facility at the Port of Los Angeles.

In March, SpaceX announced that it would manufacture its launch vehicle and spaceship at a new facility on Seaside Drive at the port. By May, approximately 40 SpaceX employees were working on the BFR. SpaceX planned to transport the launch vehicle by barge, through the Panama Canal, to Cape Canaveral for launch.

In August 2018, the US military publicly expressed interest in using BFR.

Design 

The upper stage, known as Big Falcon Ship (BFS), included a small delta wing at the rear end with split flaps for pitch and roll control. The delta wing and split flaps were said to expand the flight envelope to allow the ship to land in a variety of atmospheric densities (vacuum, thin, or heavy atmosphere) with a wide range of payloads. The BFS originally had six Raptor engines, with four vacuum and two sea-level. By late 2017, SpaceX added a third sea-level engine (totaling 7) to increase engine-out capability  and allow greater payload landings.

Three BFS versions were described: BFS cargo, BFS tanker, and BFS crew. The cargo version would be used to reach Earth orbit as well as carry cargo to the Moon or Mars. After refueling in an elliptical Earth orbit, BFS could land on the Moon and return to Earth without another refueling.

Additionally, the BFR could theoretically carry passengers/cargo in Earth-to-Earth transport, delivering its payload anywhere within 90 minutes.

Starship and Super Heavy 

In 2018 Musk announced a planned 2023 lunar circumnavigation mission (#dearMoon project). He showed a redesigned BFR concept with three rear fins and two front canard fins, replacing the previous delta wing and split flaps. The revised design used seven Raptor engines and had two small actuating canard fins near the nose, and three large fins at the base, two of which would actuate, with all three serving as landing legs.

The two major parts were renamed to Starship (second stage) and Super Heavy (booster stage). In 2019, SpaceX began to refer to the Starship/Super Heavy combination as the SpaceX Starship system.

Stainless steel 
In January 2019, Musk announced a major design change: Starship and Super Heavy would be made from stainless steel instead of carbon fiber. His stated reason was that "stainless steel was "obviously cheap, it's obviously fast—but it's not obviously the lightest. But it is actually the lightest. If you look at the properties of a high-quality stainless steel, the thing that isn't obvious is that at cryogenic temperatures, the strength is boosted by 50 percent." The high melting point of 300-series steel would eliminate the need for a heat shield on Starship's space-facing side, while the much hotter Earth-facing side would be cooled by allowing fuel or water to bleed through micropores in a double-wall stainless steel skin, removing heat by evaporation.

Both rockets were assemblies of vertically stacked steel cylinders (rings) welded to each other.

In 2019, the design reverted to six Raptor engines, with three optimized for sea-level and three optimized for vacuum. Initial Super Heavy test flights would use fewer engines, perhaps approximately 20.

Musk hinted at an expendable variant that could place 250,000 kg into low orbit.

The Raptor design was refined, higher thrust versions. The initial 37 engines were reduced to 31 in 2020. Musk stated that SpaceX would complete hundreds of cargo flights before carrying human passengers.

In February 2021 SpaceX completed raising  in additional equity financing. In April, SpaceX publicly forecast that Earth to Earth passenger flights would be common within five years.

After atmospheric descent tests in 2020-2021 SpaceX made Starship's body flaps narrower and lighter.

Second stage prototypes 

SpaceX prototypes are subjected to many tests before one is launched. Proof pressure tests come first. The tanks are filled with a liquid or gas to test their strength and safety factor. SpaceX tests some tanks beyond the specified limit, to find the point at which they burst. The engines were tested in later prototypes, while the vehicle remained tethered to the ground (static fire). After passing these tests vehicles launch, either flying within the atmosphere, or reaching orbit.

Starhopper 

Construction on the initial steel test article—Starship Hopper, Hopper, Hoppy, or Starhopper began at Boca Chica in 2018. Starhopper had a single engine and was test flown to develop landing and low-altitude/low-velocity control algorithms.

Starhopper used LOX and liquid methane fuel.

Testing 
It passed tanking tests, wet dress rehearsals, and pre-burner tests. A storm blew over and damaged Starhopper's nose cone. SpaceX continued testing without one.

It then passed a static fire test,  and in a tethered test reached 1 metre altitude.

Mark series (Mk1 - Mk4) 
SpaceX began building two high-altitude prototypes simultaneously, Mk1 in Texas and Mk2 in Florida, using competing teams that shared progress, insights, and build techniques. These vehicles featured three Raptor methalox engines and were meant to reach an altitude . An Mk3 prototype began construction in late-2019.

It was intended for testing flight and reentry profiles, in pursuit of a suborbital flight. When announced, it boasted three sea-level Raptors, two fins each at the front and back, and a nose cone containing cold-gas reaction control thrusters,. all of which were removed thereafter.

Mk4 construction began in Florida in October, but was scrapped after a few weeks.

On 20 November 2019, Mk1 blew apart during a pressure test. Mk2 was never completed.

In December 2019, Musk redesignated Mk3 as Starship SN1 and predicted that minor design improvements would continue through SN20. In January 2020, SpaceX performed pressurization tests in Boca Chica. The test was considered a success as 8.5 represented a safety factor of 1.4 times the  operational pressure.

SpaceX began stacking SN1 in February 2020 after successful pressurization tests on propellant tank prototypes. SN1 was destroyed during a cryogenic pressurization test (28 February) due to a design flaw in the lower tank thrust structure.

Hops (SN3 - SN6)

SN3 and SN4 

SN3 was destroyed during testing on 3 April 2020 due to a bad testing configuration. 

SN4 passed cryogenic pressure testing (26 April) and two static fires (5 and 7 May): one tested the main tanks, while the other tested the fuel header tank. After uninstalling the engine, a new cryogenic pressure test was conducted (19 May). A leak in the methane fuel piping ignited, causing significant damage to the rocket's base, destroying the control wiring. SN4 was destroyed  (29 May), due to a failure with the Ground Support Equipment's quick-disconnect function.

SN5 and SN6 
After a static fire test (30 July), SN5 completed a 150-meter flight (4 August) with engine SN27. SN6 completed a static fire (24 August) and a 150-meter hop test flight with engine SN29 (3 September).

In January 2021, SN6 was scrapped, followed by SN5 in February.

High-altitude test flights (SN8 - SN15)

SN8 and SN9 
SN8 was planned to be built out of 304L stainless steel, although some parts may have used 301 steel. In late October and November, SN8 survived four static fires. During the third test (12 November), debris from the pad caused the vehicle to lose pneumatics. Launch took place on 9 December. Launch, ascent, reorientation, and controlled descent were successful, but low pressure in the methane header tank kept the engines from producing enough thrust for the landing burn, destroying SN8 on impact.

On 11 December, the stand beneath SN9 failed, causing the vehicle to tip and contact the walls inside the High Bay. SN9 then required a replacement forward flap. SN9 conducted 6 static fires in January 2021, including three separate static fires. Engines 44 and 46 had to be replaced. After struggling to gain FAA permission, SN9 conducted a  flight test (2 February). Ascent, engine cutoffs, reorientation and controlled descent were stable, but one engine's oxygen pre-burner failed, sending SN9 crashing into the landing pad. The landing pad was then reinforced with an additional layer of concrete. After the SN9 failure, all three engines were used to perform the belly flop landing sequence. This offered a failsafe should one fail to ignite.

SN10 - SN14 
SN10's first cryogenic proof test succeeded (8 February), followed by a static fire (23 February). After an engine swap came another static fire (25 February).

Two launch attempts were conducted on 3 March. The first attempt was automatically aborted after one engine produced too much thrust while throttling up. After a 3-hour delay to increase the tolerance, the second attempt landed without exploding. The test ended with a hard landing-at 10 m/s-most likely due to partial helium ingestion from the fuel header tank. Three landing legs were not locked in place, producing a slight lean after landing. Although the vehicle initially remained intact, the impact crushed the legs and part of the leg skirt. Eight minutes later the prototype exploded.

SN11 accomplished a cryogenic proof test (12 March) that included a test of the Reaction Control System (RCS), followed by a static fire test (15 March). Immediately after ignition, the test was aborted. Another static fire attempt led to reports that one of the three engines had been removed for repairs. A replacement engine was installed and a third static fire was attempted (26 March ). A 10 km flight test was conducted in heavy fog (30 March). The test included engine cutoffs, flip maneuver, flap control and descent, along with a visible fire on engine 2 during the ascent. Just after the defective engine was re-ignited for the landing burn, SN11 lost telemetry at T+ 5:49 and disintegrated. SN12 through SN14 never launched.

SN15 - SN19 
SN15 introduced improved avionics software, an updated aft skirt propellant architecture, and a new Raptor design and configuration. A Starlink antenna on the side of the vehicle was another new feature. SN15 underwent an ambient temperature pressure test (9 April), A cryogenic proof test (12 April), and a header tank cryogenic proof test (13 April). Then a static fire (26 April) and a header tank static fire (27 April) followed. A small fire near the base was controlled shortly after landing. After its engines were removed, it was retired on 31 May, the first Starship prototype to fly, land and be recovered. It took its place in the now called Rocket Garden. SN16 and SN17 were scrapped, and SN18 and SN19 were never completed.

Orbital launches (SN20/Ship 20-)

SN20/Ship 20 - Ship 23 

SN20 (Ship 20) now resides in the Rocket Garden, previously planned to be launched atop the Super Heavy booster. SN20's thermal protection system covers much of the vehicle.

SN20 rolled out to the launch mount on 5 August 2021 and was the first to be stacked on a booster. It used Booster 4 for a fit test. FCC filings in May 2021 by SpaceX stated that the orbital flight would launch from Boca Chica. After separation, Starship would enter orbit and around 90 minutes later attempt a soft ocean landing around 100 km off the coast of Kauai.

Ship 21 was scrapped, Ship 22 moved out to the Rocket Garden in late February 2022. Ship 23 was scrapped and partially recycled in Ship 24 which was targeted for an orbital flight as of September 2022.

Ship 24 
As of December 2022, Ship 24 is planned to make an orbital test flight atop Booster 7. It was first spotted in November 2021, and made cryogenic proof tests on 2, 6, and 7 June 2022. Starship 24 then conducted spin prime tests on 18, 20, and 21 July 2022, with an additional one on 8 August 2022. It was static fired with two engines on 9 August 2022. On 8 September 2022, Ship 24 underwent a static fire test where all six of its engines; three sea level and three vacuum engines, endured an 8 second test. The test damaged/destroyed around 30 of its 25,000 ceramic tiles. The ship went through repairs and was subsequently stacked on top of Booster 7 in late October ahead of further testing. As of 26 January 2023, Ship 24 is rolled back to the production site for final TPS work for orbital test flight.

Super Heavy prototypes 

Boosters do not have an engine skirt. Without engines, boosters are about 3 meters shorter.

BN1 
BN1 was the first Super-Heavy Booster prototype, a pathfinder that was not intended for flight tests. Sections of the ~ tall test article were manufactured throughout the fall. Section stacking began in December 2020. BN1 was fully stacked inside the High Bay on 18 March. On 30 March 2021, BN1 was scrapped.

BN3/B3 
BN3 (Booster 3) was used for ground tests. A cryogenic proof test was completed (13 July 2021). Booster 3 completed stacking in the High Bay (29 June 2021), and moved to the test pad without engines. Three engines were subsequently added.

A static fire test was conducted 19 July 2021. BN3/Booster 3 was partially scrapped on 15 August 2021, while the LOX tank remained welded to the Test Stand. The LOX tank was taken off the Test Stand on the 13th January 2022.

B4 
Booster 4 first became visible on 3 July 2021. Musk ordered several hundred SpaceX employees at Hawthorne to relocate to Boca Chica to accelerate the development of SN20, BN4, and the Orbital Launch Platform in an attempt to put the Starship system on the pad by 5 August 2021. BN4 was fully stacked on 1 August, with a full complement of 29 engines installed on 2 August 2021. Grid fins were added to support atmospheric reentry testing, but notably, the grid fins on the Booster 4 test article did not fold down for launch.

SN20 was stacked on top of Booster 4 on 6 August 2021 for a fitting test, making it the largest rocket ever. Booster 4 was then returned to the High Bay for secondary wiring. On 9 September 2021, Booster 4 came again to the launch site on top of the Orbital Launch mount.

B4 completed its first cryogenic proof test (17 December 2021), and a pneumatic proof test (19 December 2021). It underwent another cryogenic proof test and a full-load cryogenic proof test. B4 and Ship 20 were then retired.

B5 
Parts for B5 were observed as early as 19 July 2021. Stacking for BN5 completed in November, although on 8 December 2021, B5 retired to stand alongside SN15 and SN16.

B7 
Parts for B7 were first spotted on 29 September 2021. B7 was placed on the orbital launch mount on 31 March 2022. After completing a cryogenic proof test on 4 April 2022, it was placed onto the new booster test stand on 8 April 2022. B7 completed another cryogenic test on 14 April 2022, but the downcomer suffered a failure and ruptured. On 18 April 2022, B7 returned to the production site for repairs. On 5 May 2022, B7 was again placed on the orbital launch mount. B7 then completed two cryogenic tests on 9 and 11 May 2022. It was then returned back to the production site and entered the new Mega Bay (also known as Wide Bay or High Bay 2), for repairs and additional equipment, upgraded grid fins and engines, and two more 'chines' or 'strakes' (triangular structures placed on the aft section to aid in aerodynamic control). B7 went through more testing (11 July 2022) where it experienced an anomaly during an attempted 33 engine spin prime test and a detonation occurred underneath the engines. The booster then rolled back to the Mega Bay. B7 was transported back to the orbital launch pad with 20 outer Raptor engines (August 4 to August 5 2022) and completed its first single engine static fire test (August 9 2022). B7 completed a 20-second static fire (August 11 2022), the longest static fire on a Starship prototype to date. Following a successful set of tests, it returned to the production site to receive the remaining 13 engines. B7 was lifted back onto the launch mount using the chopsticks catching and lifting system (23 August 2022). It underwent further testing including its 13 inner engines (26 August 2022). B7 completed a multi-engine static fire (31 August 2022). This was followed by multiple spin prime tests, and a seven-engine static fire on 19 September 2022. B7 again returned to the Mega Bay on 21 September 2022. After upgrades it was again lifted on the launch pad (8 October 2022). Ship 24 was then stacked on top B7 (12 October 2022) and was removed after completing multiple cryogenic load tests. B7 then completed a spin prime test of multiple engines, (12 November 2022) and afterwards a 14 engine static fire test, (14 November 2022) and finally an 11 engine static fire in an autogenous pressurization test (29 November 2022). As of 9 December 2022, B7 has rolled back to the Mega Bay presumably for further shielding. Soon Booster 7 was rolled back to the launch site in January 2023 where it was stacked with Ship 24 on the OLM for partial and full Wet Dress Rehearsals (Jan 23) before Ship 24 was destacked and sent to the Rocket Garden for final TPS work. On February 9, 2023, Booster 7 attempted a 10 second duration 33-engine static fire where 31 of the 33 engines successfully fired for the full duration. One of its engines was disabled just prior to testing, and one engine shutdown prematurely.

B8 
The first part of the booster, the engine thrust puck, was spotted on October 6, 2021. Other parts for B8 were observed on February 3, 2022. The booster was fully stacked on July 8, 2022. It travelled to the launch site on 19 September 2022.

Test tanks

General test tanks 
Test Tank 1 (TT1) was a subscale test tank consisting of two forward bulkheads connected by a small barrel section. TT1 was used to test new materials and construction methods.

Liquid Oxygen Header Test Tank (LOX HTT) was similar to TT1, but was based on the LOX Header tank inside a nosecone section. On 24 January 2020, the tank underwent a pressurization test which lasted several hours. The following day it was tested to destruction.

Test Tank 2 (TT2) was another subscale test tank similar to TT1. On 27 January 2020, TT2 underwent an ambient temperature pressure test where it reached a pressure of  before a leak occurred.

EDOME is a test tank created to test flatter domes, possibly used on future Starship prototypes. It was moved to the launch site in July 2022, and back to the production site the next month, and never received testing. It was later moved from the production site to the new Masseys site on 22 September 2022, which conducts non-flight hardware testing. On 30 September 2022, it burst during a cryogenic pressure test to failure. After repairs, it was tested to destruction in late October 2022.

Starship-based test tanks 
SN2 was a half-size test tank used to test welding quality and thrust puck design. The thrust puck is found on the bottom of the vehicle where in later Starship tests up to three sea-level Raptor engines would be mounted. SN2 passed a pressure test on 8 March 2020.

SN7 was a pathfinder test article for the switch to type 304L stainless steel. A cryogenic proof test was performed on 15 June 2020, achieving a pressure of  before a leak occurred. During a pressurize to failure test on 23 June 2020, the tank burst at an unknown pressure.

SN7.1 was the second 304L test tank, with the goal of reaching a higher failure pressure. The tank was repeatedly tested in September, and tested to destruction on 23 September.

SN7.2 was created to test thinner walls, and therefore, lower mass. It is believed to be constructed from 3 mm steel sheets rather than the 4 mm thickness of its predecessors. On 26 January 2021, SN7.2 passed a cryogenic proof test. On 4 February, during a pressurize to failure test, the tank developed a leak. On 15 March, SN7.2 was retired.

Super Heavy-based test tanks
BN2.1 was rolled out on 3 June 2021 for cryogenic tests (8 June) and (17 June).

B2.1 (not BN2.1) survived three cryogenic tests on on 1, 2, and 3 December.

B7.1 was first cryogenically proof tested on 28 June 2022, and tested again on 19 July 2022. During a suspected pressurize to failure test two days later, it received minor damage. After repairs, it underwent a fourth cryogenic proof test (27 July), a fifth (1 September), and a sixth five days later. It then rolled back to the production site (16 September). B7.1 left the production site (22 September) to head to the new Masseys site.

GSE-based test tanks 
GSE 4.1 was first spotted in August 2021, and was the first GSE test tank built, made from parts of GSE 4. It underwent a cryogenic proof test (23 August) before it was rolled to Sanchez site. It was rolled back to the launch site in November 2021 and underwent an apparent cryogenic proof test to failure (18 January), where it burst at an unknown pressure.

See also 
 Launch vehicle system tests
 List of SpaceX Starship flight tests
 SpaceX Mars program

References 

development
History of transportation in the United States
Spaceflight histories